Knut Mørkved (29 March 1938 – 10 November 2017) was a Norwegian diplomat.

He hailed from Steinkjer as a son of county forest manager Karl Mørkved and grandson of Lorents Mørkved. He took the mag.art. degree in political science and started working for the Norwegian Ministry of Foreign Affairs in 1967. His early diplomatic stations were in Brussels, Cairo and at the UN in New York City. From 1976 to 1980 he served as the secretary of the Standing Committee on Foreign Affairs. He served as Norway's ambassador to the Philippines from 1983 to 1987 and Egypt from 1988 to 1992, and after a stint as a special adviser in the Ministry of Foreign Affairs from 1992 to 1996 he served as ambassador to Croatia from 1997 to 2001 before retiring. During his time in Cairo he also had side accreditations to Jordan, Syria and Sudan, and while in Croatia he also covered Bosnia and Hercegovina.

He resided in Bærum and died in November 2017.

References

1938 births
2017 deaths
People from Steinkjer
Norwegian civil servants
Norwegian expatriates in Belgium
Norwegian expatriates in the United States
Ambassadors of Norway to the Philippines
Ambassadors of Norway to Egypt
Ambassadors of Norway to Jordan
Ambassadors of Norway to Syria
Ambassadors of Norway to Sudan
Ambassadors of Norway to Croatia
People from Akershus